Tambaksari is a district in the city of Surabaya in East Java.

Populated places in East Java
Districts of East Java